Subashi may refer to:

 The Subaşi, Ottoman gubernatorial title which most often means the commander of the town or castle
 Subashi Temple, a ruined Buddhist temple on the Silk Road, in Xinjiang, China
 Subashi, Iran, a village in Hamadan Province, Iran
 Subashi Formation, a late Cretaceous formation from Xinjiang, China